Tiny Broken Heart is a song written by Charlie Louvin and Ira Louvin. Writing credit is shared by the musician, 'Smilin' Eddie Hill' who brought the song (among others) to Fred Rose and added his own name as coauthor.  The Louvin Brothers recorded it in 1956 for their first album, Tragic Songs of Life.

The song tells the story of a young farm boy's love for the daughter of a neighboring farm worker.  It is written from the unusual perspective of the seven-year-old protagonist.

Cover versions 
 Hazel Dickens & Alice Gerrard for one of their 1960s recordings.  A remastered version appears on Pioneering Women of Bluegrass, (1996, Smithsonian Folkways).
 Doc Watson also recorded the song in the early sixties, but did not release it.  Later it emerged on Songs From the Southern Mountains (1994, Sugar Hill)
 The Bluegrass Cardinals, for their Home is Where the Heart Is (1984, Sugar Hill).
 Dan Tyminski included it on his solo album, Carry Me Across the Mountain (2000, Doobie Shea) and performed it with Alison Krauss and Union Station for Live (2002, Rounder)

References

1956 songs
Bluegrass songs
Songs written by Fred Rose (songwriter)
Songs written by Ira Louvin
Songs written by Charlie Louvin